Francisco Antonio de Zela y Arizaga (born July 24, 1768 in Lima - died July 18, 1819 in Panama City)  is notable for sending forth the first libertarian outcry in the Peruvian city of Tacna on June 20, 1811 in an attempt to start the independence of Peru.  De Zela was supported by a large group of criollos, mestizos and Indians, among them the caciques José Rosa Ara and Miguel Copaja.

The rebellion of Tacna was in close contact with the Argentine revolution, initiated in Buenos Aires on May 25, 1810.  The Argentines sent an army to the Charcas region (Bolivia), under the command of general Antonio González de Balcarce and the lawyer Juan José Castelli.  They sent proclamations to various towns in southern Peru, inviting them to follow them in the revolution.  The town of Tacna was the first under the direction of Don Francisco Antonio De Zela, occupying the quarters of the Spanish authorities that night.

On the same day (June 20) the Argentine army was defeated by Spanish forces in the Battle of Huaqui, bordering Lake Titicaca, and thus De Zela never received the needed support.  This news created a morale problem for the De Zela's troops and as a result, they were defeated by the Spaniards.  The main leaders of the rebellion were caught, among them De Zela, and they were led to Lima and condemned to 10 years in the military prison of Chagres, Panama, where De Zela died.

His house, located on Zela Street #542, was named a Historical Monument on July 26, 1961 and to this day continues to be one of the major tourist attractions of the city of Tacna.

June 20 is a local holiday in city of Tacna.

See also 
 Battle of Huaqui
 History of Peru

1786 births
1821 deaths
People from Lima
19th-century Peruvian people
Peruvian rebels